Duryu Park Stadium is a stadium in South Korea.

See also
Sports in South Korea
List of sports venues in South Korea

External links
 Duryu Park Sports Facilities Management Center 
 World Stadiums

Tennis venues in South Korea
Sport in Daegu
Football venues in South Korea